Fermo Dante Marchetti (born Dante Pilade Marchetti, 28 August 1876 – 11 June 1940) was an Italian composer and songwriter, best known for the music for the song "Fascination". He was born in Massa Carrara, Tuscany, Italy, and died in Paris, France.

1876 births
1940 deaths
19th-century Italian composers
19th-century Italian male musicians
20th-century Italian composers
20th-century Italian male musicians
Italian songwriters
Italian male composers
Male songwriters
Musicians from Tuscany
People from the Province of Massa-Carrara